Henry Skinner West (1870–1961) was the fifth principal of Maryland State Normal School (now Towson University).

West was Maryland educated and graduated from Baltimore City College. He earned both his B.A. and Ph.D. degrees from Johns Hopkins University. West possessed had an impressive academic background, teaching at all levels from primary to college. In 1917, Dr. West was appointed to serve as principal of the Normal School. During his tenure, MSNS faced some of its most difficult times. Rnrollment dropped severely due to World War I, funding for the School was inadequate, dormitory space was insufficient, and pay scale for teachers was poor. In 1920, West left his position as Principal to become the Superintendent of Schools in Baltimore. He held this position for five years and in 1926 went to the University of Miami in Florida to become its first Dean of the College of Liberal Arts. As Principal of the Normal School, Dr. West initiated an enrollment campaign to attract more students, reorganized the school's administration, introduced the first summer session in 1918 and was instrumental in getting the State to adopt a system of teacher certification.

External links
 Presidential Biographies - Towson Archives

Presidents of Towson University
Johns Hopkins University alumni
Baltimore City College alumni
1961 deaths
1870 births